Abu Dhabi Metro is an under construction metro line that will be part of a larger transit network for the city of Abu Dhabi, United Arab Emirates.

Plan
The entire transit network will be 131 km long when complete, including an  partially underground metro line, two light rail lines and bus rapid transit. It is expected to cost Dh7 billion.

Phase 1 of the network was intended to be completed by 2020, with a further in later phases. However, as of August 2022, no contracts have been signed and no construction has started. 

The system will be composed of four basic lines:
 Line   heavy rail rapid transit of which  will be underground
 Line   light rail with 24 stops
 Line   light rail with 21 stops 
 Line   bus rapid transit loop with 25 stops

The metro will mainly connect the proposed Central Business District with Sowwah Island, Reem Island, Saadiyat Island, Yas Island, Abu Dhabi International Airport, Sheikh Zayed Grand Mosque, Masdar City, Capital City District, Emerald Gateway, Zayed Sports City and ADNEC.

Construction
Firms interested in bidding for contracts on phase 1 of the project were due to submit statements of intent to the government by mid June 2013.

The Department of Transport has planned phase 1 for construction in three contracts:
  civil works for the above-ground structures (design and build contracts.
  underground construction work (design and build contracts.
  the rail system, the rolling stock and the operation and maintenance for the line; (design, build, operate and maintain contracts.)

Contracts are due to be awarded in 2015.  Under the original plan, the first phase was due to be complete by 2015, but is now scheduled to be operational no sooner than 2018–2019.

From October 2016, the project halted. In August 2018, the Abu Dhabi Department of Transport invited bids for consultancy services for the emirate's metro and light rail projects completed in 2033.

Notes

References

External links
 Abu Dhabi Department of Transport page

Rapid transit in the United Arab Emirates
Transport in Abu Dhabi
Proposed rapid transit